The Snow Hill Island Formation is an Early Maastrichtian geologic formation found on James Ross Island, James Ross Island group, Antarctica. Remains of a paravian theropod Imperobator antarcticus have been recovered from it, as well as the elasmarian ornithopods Trinisaura santamartaensis, Biscoveosaurus and Morrosaurus antarcticus, the ankylosaurian Antarctopelta oliveroi, and the shark Notidanodon sp. Alongside these described genera are also the remains of indeterminate elasmosaurids, lithostrotian titanosaurs and an indeterminate pterosaur.

In the Herbert Sound Member of the Snow Hill Island Formation, bivalves, ammonites, and fish were found.

Fossil content

See also 
 List of fossiliferous stratigraphic units in Antarctica
 List of dinosaur-bearing rock formations
 Sobral Formation
 South Polar region of the Cretaceous

References

Bibliography

Further reading 
 D. Néraudeau, A. Crame, and M. Kooser. 2000. Upper Cretaceous echinoids from James Ross Basin, Antarctica. Géobios 33(4):455-466 
 R. A. Otero, S. Soto-Acuna, A. O. Vargas, D. Rubilar Rogers, R. E. Yury Yanez and C. S. Gutstein. 2013. Additions to the diversity of elasmosaurid plesiosaurs from the Upper Cretaceous of Antarctica. Gondwana Research 

Geologic formations of Antarctica
Cretaceous System of Antarctica
Campanian Stage
Sandstone formations
Mudstone formations
Paleontology in Antarctica
James Ross Island group